Hunhukwe is a village in Kgalagadi District of Botswana. It is located in the northern part of the district, and it has a primary school and a clinic. The population was 753 in 2011 census.

References

Kgalagadi District
Villages in Botswana